The Ponzi Scheme is the second studio album by the American alternative rock band Firewater. It was released in 1998 by Jetset.

Critical reception
The Washington Post wrote that "The Ponzi Scheme isn't as diabolically sophisticated as it intends, but the band ... does have a cosmopolitan style." The Calgary Herald listed it as the eighth best album of 1998, writing that it "brings together a potpourri of elements—horns, guitars, jazz, Latin, ska, funk and rock riffs—and creates a magnificent musical melange."

Track listing

Personnel
Adapted from The Ponzi Scheme liner notes.

Firewater
 Tod Ashley – lead vocals, bass guitar, production
 George Javori – drums
 Ori Kaplan – guitar
 Tim Otto – saxophone
 Hahn Rowe – violin
 Paul Wallfisch – piano, organ
Additional musicians
 Duane Denison – guitar (11, 12)
 Pamela Fleming – trumpet (7)
 Susan Graham – alto saxophone (7)
 Paula Henderson – baritone saxophone (7)
 Jennifer Hill – saxophone (7), piccolo (7)
 Kurt Hoffman – saxophone (11, 12)

Additional musicians (cont.)
 Jim Kimball – drums (11, 12)
 Tamir Muskat – drums (2, 8)
 David Ouimet – piano (7, 11, 12), organ (7, 11, 12), trombone (7, 11, 12)
 Joe Plummer – saxophone (7)
 Jane Scarpantoni – cello (3, 4, 10, 12)
 Birgit Staudt – accordion (5)
Production and additional personnel
 Jay Healy – mixing (3)
 Doug Henderson – production, mixing (1, 6, 7, 9, 11, 12)
 Rod Hui – mixing (5)
 Ted Jensen – mastering
 Sylvia Massy – mixing (2, 4, 8–10)

Release history

References

External links 
 

1998 albums
Firewater (band) albums
Albums produced by Doug Henderson (musician)
Jetset Records albums